Iya Sergeyevna Savvina (2 March 1936 – 27 August 2011) was a Soviet film actress who was named a People's Artist of the USSR in 1990.

Biography
Savvina was not a professionally trained actress. She graduated from the Department of Journalism of the Moscow State University and has appeared in 30 films following her star turn as Anna Sergeyevna in Iosif Kheifets's The Lady with the Dog (1960). Since 1977, she had served in Moscow Art Theatre. During her career she received  many awards including the Crystal Turandot Award and State Prizes of USSR and Russian SFSR.

Savvina was a notable memoirist and cinema scholar who wrote about her colleagues Faina Ranevskaya, Mikhail Ulyanov, Lyubov Orlova and others. She is also known for providing the voice of the Piglet in the Soviet animation of Winnie-the-Pooh. She was a prominent actress by then, and director Fyodor Khitruk invited her merely to review his initial work, because he knew that Savvina was a big fan of the Winnie-the-Pooh story. The decision to cast her as the Piglet came later, and her records had to be sped up to change the tone of her voice (the same technique was used for the main character). Savvina based her intonation on Bella Akhmadulina.

Savvina was married to Vsevolod Shestakov, a prominent geologist and amateur stage actor. Their son Sergey was born in 1957 with Down syndrome, yet became a professional graphical artist and Russian-English translator.

Selected filmography
 Gentle (1960) as Gentle Woman
 The Lady with the Dog (1960) as Anna Sergeevna
 They're Calling, Open the Door (1965) as Genka's mother
 The Story of Asya Klyachina (1966) as Asya Klyachina
 Anna Karenina (1967) as Dolly
 Two Comrades Were Serving (1968) as Sasha
 Winnie-the-Pooh (1969, and its 1971 and 1972 sequels), voice of Piglet
 A Lover's Romance (1974) as Tanya's mother
 The Nose (1977) as prostitute
 The Garage (1979) as Lidia Anikeeva
 Tears Were Falling (1982) as Irina Vasina
 Private Life (1982) as Natalia Ilyinichna
 Extend, Extend, Fascination... (1984)

References

External links

1936 births
2011 deaths
Soviet film actresses
Soviet stage actresses
Soviet voice actresses
Recipients of the USSR State Prize
People's Artists of the USSR
Moscow State University alumni
Deaths from skin cancer
Deaths from cancer in Russia